Tenellia diminutiva is a species of sea slug, an aeolid nudibranch, a marine gastropod mollusc in the family Fionidae.

Distribution
This species was described from the Hawaii Institute of Marine Biology, Coconut Island, Oahu, Hawaii.

References 

Fionidae
Gastropods described in 1980